Thompson House is an historic structure located in Poughkeepsie, New York. Built c. 1880, it was listed on the National Register of Historic Places on November 26, 1982. The private residence is considered to be in "excellent" condition.

References

Houses on the National Register of Historic Places in New York (state)
Second Empire architecture in New York (state)
Houses completed in 1880
National Register of Historic Places in Poughkeepsie, New York
Houses in Poughkeepsie, New York